The Czech Fourth Division is the fourth tier of football in the Czech Republic. The level consists of six divisions, named Divize A-F, Divize A-C each holding 16 teams and Divize D-F each holding 14 teams. The top teams from Divize A, B and C are promoted to the Bohemian Football League while the top teams from Divize D, E and F are promoted to the Moravian–Silesian Football League. The number of relegated teams varies between the divisions, the destination of the relegated teams is one of the 14 Regional Divisions at level 5 of the pyramid.

The format of the three Bohemian divisions (A, B and C) is unconventional in that it does not allow draws. As of the 2014–15 season, if a match is tied, the winner is decided by a penalty shootout. The winner of the shootout gets two points and the loser gets one.

Since 2021–22 season, the teams are again awarded by 3 points for a win and 1 point for a tie.

Fourth Division clubs, 2022–23

Divize A

Divize B

Divize C

Divize D

Divize E

Divize F

References

 Official page for Divize A, B, C
 Official page for Divize D, E, F

External links
4. Ligy tables, results and fixtures at Soccerway

4
Fourth level football leagues in Europe
Professional sports leagues in the Czech Republic